Ailish Considine (born 9 July 1992) is an Irish-born Australian rules footballer who played for the Adelaide Football Club in the AFL Women's (AFLW). Considine was drafted by Adelaide as a rookie signing after previously playing gaelic football and camogie for County Clare in Ireland. She was the first Irish female to become a Premiership Player with the Adelaide Crows in 2019 when they defeated Carlton in the ALFW Grand Final at a full capacity Adelaide Oval. In December 2022, Adelaide delisted Considine after she was on the injury list all of AFL Women's season seven.

Personal life
Considine was born in Ireland.  She grew up playing Gaelic Football with her club Kilmihil and Camogie with Kilmaley while also representing Clare at the highest level as a dual player. She studied Exercise & Fitness Science at the University of Limerick and graduated in 2018. Considine writes a RTE Weekly Diary] discussing her experiences as a professional athlete in Adelaide. Her sister Eimear plays international rugby for the Ireland women's team.

References

External links 

1992 births
Living people
Adelaide Football Club (AFLW) players
Clare ladies' Gaelic footballers
Irish female players of Australian rules football
Ladies' Gaelic footballers who switched code
Irish expatriate sportspeople in Australia
Lesbian sportswomen
LGBT players of Australian rules football
Irish LGBT sportspeople
21st-century LGBT people